Zhou's box turtle (Cuora zhoui) is a species of turtle in the family Geoemydidae (formerly Bataguridae). The species is apparently endemic to China.

Etymology
The specific name, zhoui, is in honor of Chinese herpetologist Zhou Jiufa.

Geographic range
C. zhoui is only known from Chinese food market specimens, and from a relatively small number of individuals that are part of captive breeding programs in China, Germany (notably the Münster Zoo), and the United States. In December 2018, the known captive population numbered about 140 individuals, including 80 hatched at the Münster Zoo. It may be found in the forests of southeastern Yunnan or western Guangxi, although it has never been recorded in the wild.

Conservation Status
The over-collection of turtles in Asia for food, medicinal purposes, and the pet trade industry are the primary causes of the decimation of this turtle's population. As of 2012, this species is considered to be critically endangered and in the middle of a conservation crisis.

References

Further reading
Zhao, "Er-mi"; Zhou, Ting; Ye, Ping (1990). "A new Chinese box turtle (Testudinata: Emydidae) — Cuora zhoui ". pp. 213–216. In: Zhao, "Ermi" (editor) (1990). From Water Onto Land. Beijing: Chinese Society for the Study of Amphibians and Reptiles. ("Cuora zhoui Zhao sp. nov.", pp. 213, 216). (in Chinese and English).

External links
 Listed as Critically Endangered (CR A1d+2d)
 
Lee DS, Levine LM (2004). First captive breeding of Zhou's Box Turtle, Cuora zhoui, in North America. 
Spinks, P. Q., Thomson, R. C., Zhang, Y., Che, J., Wu, Y., & Shaffer, H. B. (2012). Species boundaries and phylogenetic relationships in the critically endangered Asian box turtle genus Cuora. Molecular Phylogenetics and Evolution, 63(3), 656–667. 
Struijk RPJH, Woldring LA. Cuora Studbooks, an overview. 
CITES Proposal 11.36 – status and biological information on Cuora species. 

Reptiles of China
Cuora
Reptiles described in 1990
Taxonomy articles created by Polbot
Taxa named by Zhao Ermi
Critically endangered fauna of China